Ivan Ustinovich Kharchenko (23 September 1918 – 1 July 1989) was a Soviet Army Military engineering Colonel and Hero of the Soviet Union. During World War II, he was a platoon commander. Kharchenko was promoted to the rank of Junior lieutenant in 1939, lieutenant in 1943 and senior lieutenant in 1944. He reportedly personally defused more than 50,000 explosives, including bombs, mines, and shells. For his actions in defusing explosives, Kharchenko was named a Hero of the Soviet Union and awarded the Gold Star and Order of Lenin on 2 November 1944. In the citation for the Hero of the Soviet Union award, it was stated that Kharchenko personally defused more than 1500 bombs weighing more than 500 kilograms each and 25,000 other explosive objects. After World War II, Kharchenko continued his military service until retirement in 1964. Until 1956 he was personally engaged in rendering innocuous explosive items left over from World War II. 

In March 1961, the battalion commanded by Kharchenko led a rescue operation after the Kurenivka mudslide in Kyiv.

Early life 
Ivan Kharchenko was born on 23 September 1918 in Komarovka village of  Nizhyn Uyezd in the Chernigov Governorate to the family of a peasant. He graduated from seven classes and worked as a factory carpenter in Khimki. In 1938, Kharchenko joined the Red Army

World War II 
In 1941 Kharchenko became underleitenant and a platoon commander in the 22 Detached Engineering and anti-gas battalion of Local Anti-Aircraft Defence troops. In 1942 he came back to the unit where he had served in non-commitioned positions -- to the 6th Engineering and anti-gas regiment of the NKVD antiaircraft defense troops. He helped to defuse more than 26,000 German shells, mines and bombs during the Battle of Stalingrad and the Battle of Kiev (1943). On 2 November 1944, he was awarded the title Hero of the Soviet Union and the Order of Lenin for his actions in defusing unexploded ordnance and mines.

Postwar 
After the end of World War II, Kharchenko defused more than 16,000 unexploded bombs, as well as other explosive devices. In 1950, he graduated from the High Officers' Engineering School in Moscow. In 1964, Kharchenko left military service and worked in the Ministry of Assembly and Special Construction Works in Kyiv until his retirement in 1986.  He died on 1 July 1989 and is buried in the Berkovetskaya Cemetery.

Military service 
 1938–1941 — 31 Detached Engineering and anti-gas battalion of Local Anti-Aircraft Defence troops, NKVD (Zaporizhia), cadet, squad leader, company's petty officer
 1941 — Courses of Unterleutnants in Leningrad Command school of the Head Department of Military engineering, cadet
 1941–1942 — 22 Detached Engineering and anti-gas battalion of Local Anti-Aircraft Defence troops, NKVD (Gorky), commander of a platoon
 1942–1943 — 31 Detached Engineering and anti-gas battalion of Local Anti-Aircraft Defence troops, NKVD (Stalingrad), commander of a platoon
 1943–1945 — 6 Engineering and anti-gas regiment of Local Anti-Aircraft Defence troops, NKVD (Kyiv), commander of a platoon
 1945–1951 — 6 Engineering and anti-gas regiment of Local Anti-Aircraft Defence troops, Interior Ministry (Kyiv), commander of a company
 1951–1955 — 3 detachment of Local Anti-Aircraft Defence troops, Interior Ministry (Kyiv), commander of a pyrotechnical team
 1955–1956 — 6 Engineering and anti-gas regiment of Local Anti-Aircraft Defence troops, Interior Ministry (Kyiv), commander of a pyrotechnical service
 1956–1960 — 6 Engineering and anti-gas regiment of Local Anti-Aircraft Defence troops, Interior Ministry (Kyiv), commander of an engineering battalion
 1960–1962 — 120 Detached Engineering and anti-gas regiment of Local Anti-Aircraft Defence troops, Soviet Army, Kyiv Military District (Kiev), commander of an engineering battalion
 1962–1964 — Headquarter of the Civil Defence of Ukrainian SSR (Kyiv), officer in charge of combat training organisation

Honors 
 Hero of the Soviet Union (2 November 1944)
 Order of Lenin
 Order of the Red Banner 
 Order of the Patriotic War, First Class 
 Order of the Red Star 
 Medal for Battle Merit 
 Medal "For the Defence of Stalingrad" 
 Medal "For the Victory over Germany in the Great Patriotic War 1941–1945"
 Honoured Member of the Interior Ministry of the USSR

References

1918 births
1989 deaths
Heroes of the Soviet Union
Recipients of the Order of Lenin
Recipients of the Order of the Red Banner
People from Chernigov Governorate
Soviet military personnel of World War II from Ukraine
Soviet colonels